Chilbosan (hangul:칠보산, hanja: 七寶山), meaning "Seven-treasure mountain", is the name of several mountains in Korea:

 North Korea:
 Chilbosan (North Hamgyong)

 South Korea:
 Chilbosan (Gyeonggi)
 Chilbosan (North Chungcheong)
 Chilbosan (North Gyeongsang)
 Chilbosan (North Jeolla)